Plinthocoelium schwarzi is a species of beetle in the family Cerambycidae. It was described by Fisher in 1914.

References

Callichromatini
Beetles described in 1914